Al Batinah North Governorate ( Muḥāfaẓat Šamāl al-Bāṭinah) is a governorate of Oman. It was created on 28 October 2011 when Al Batinah Region was split into Al Batinah North Governorate and Al Batinah South Governorate. The centre of the governorate is the wilayat of Sohar.

Provinces
Al Batinah North Governorate consists of six provinces (wilayat):
Sohar
Shinas
Liwa
Saham
Al Khaboura
Suwayq

Demographics

References

 
Governorates of Oman